Rail transport in Spain operates on four rail gauges and services are operated by a variety of private and public operators. The  total route length in 2012 was 16,026 km (10,182 km electrified).

Most railways are operated by Renfe Operadora; metre and narrow-gauge lines are operated by FEVE and other carriers in individual autonomous communities. It is proposed and planned to build or convert more lines to standard gauge, including some dual gauging of broad-gauge lines, especially where these lines link to France, including platforms to be heightened.

Spain is a member of the International Union of Railways (UIC). The UIC Country Code for Spain is 71.

History 

The first railway line in the Iberian Peninsula was built in 1848 between Barcelona and Mataró. In 1851 the Madrid-Aranjuez line was opened. In 1852 the first narrow gauge line was built; in 1863 a line reached the Portuguese border.  By 1864 the Madrid-Irun line had been opened, and the French border reached.

In 1900 the first line to be electrified was La Poveda-Madrid.

After the Spanish Civil War, the Spanish railway system was in a state of disrepair due to the damage caused by the conflict. In 1941 RENFE was created by nationalizing the private companies that built and operated the network until then, leading to a state-owned rail network.

By the 1950s, the Spanish rail network reached its historical maximum of almost 19,000 kilometers. However, from the mid-1950s onward, the network began to shrink due to the exponential increase in private vehicle ownership in Spain. During the Spanish economic miracle of the 1950s and 1960s, the number of private vehicles in Spain increased more than 14 times from the mid-1940s to the mid-1960s. This led to a decline in demand for rail transport and the closure of some rail lines that were no longer profitable. By 1993, almost 8,000 km of rail lines were dismantled. 

The last steam locomotive was withdrawn in 1975, in 1986 the maximum speed on the railways was raised to 160 km/h, and in 1992 the Madrid-Seville high-speed line opened, beginning the process of building a nationwide high-speed network known as AVE (Alta Velocidad España).

The current plans of the Spanish government are to finish the standard-gauge high-speed network by building new sections of track and upgrading and converting to standard gauge the existing line along the Mediterranean coast connecting the ports of Barcelona, Tarragona, Valencia, Cartagena and Almería, and to link Madrid with Vigo, Santiago and A Coruña in Galicia, and to extend the Madrid-Valladolid line to Burgos and the Basque cities of Bilbao and San Sebastian and Hendaye on the French border, as well as to link Madrid with Lisbon and the port of Sines through Badajoz. Former plans by the Popular Party government under PM Aznar to link all provincial capitals with high-speed rail have been shelved as unrealistic, unaffordable, and contrary to all economic logic as no European funding would be made available for such projects.

Following the opening of the AVE network, the classic Iberian gauge railways have lost importance in inter-city travel, for example, the Madrid–Barcelona railway takes over nine hours to travel between the two cities stopping at every station. With the Madrid–Barcelona high-speed rail line, the longest possible journey is just three hours. This has allowed the conventional lines to increase focus on regional and commuter traffic, along with freight. Some lines, including the Córdoba-Bobadilla section of the classic Córdoba–Málaga railway, have lost passenger traffic completely due to the opening of AVE serving the same destinations.

Many important mainland Spanish towns remain disconnected to the rail network, the largest being Marbella with a population of over 140,000, along with Roquetas de Mar (pop. 96,800), El Ejido (pop. 84,000), Chiclana de la Frontera (pop. 83,000) and Torrevieja (pop. 82,000). Other towns and municipalities are not on the national rail network but linked to light rail or metro systems, such as Santa Coloma de Gramanet, Barcelona (pop. 118,000); Getxo, Biscay (pop. 80,000); Torrent, Valencia (pop. 79,000); and Benidorm, Alicante (pop. 69,000).

Starting in Franco's regime and continuing into the 1980s, multiple lines of the Spanish rail network were closed. Campaigns for reopening former lines exist, including a reopening the branch to the aforementioned Torrevieja from the Alicante–Murcia main line; the former line from Guadix to Lorca via Baza (which would provide a direct rail link from Murcia to Granada); Plasencia to Salamanca and Gandía to Dénia.

Since 2007 the operation of freight lines was liberalized and has been open to private operators. RENFE was split in two companies (RENFE Operadora, public company that operates freight and passenger lines, and ADIF, a public company that manages the infrastructure for all public and private operators).

In 2020, long-distance passenger lines were likewise opened to private operators. Ouigo España began service on the Madrid–Barcelona route in 2021, joined by Iryo in 2022.

From 1 September to 31 December 2022 Spain has made free train tickets available under certain conditions. A €10 to €20 deposit must be placed and the scheme is only available on multi-trip tickets or season tickets, rather than singles. 16 or more train journeys must be made between the aforementioned dates in order to receive a full refund. The full refund is available on commuter journeys and medium-distance journeys of under 300 km (186 miles). The initiative is being funded via a windfall tax on banks and energy companies that have made profits from interest rates and energy prices. The tax will be introduced in 2023 and is estimated to raise up to €7 billion in two years. Money raised from the tax will also be used to build 12,000 new homes and fund youth scholarship programmes.

Operators
 Renfe Operadora is a state-owned company which operates freight and passenger trains on the  "Iberian gauge",  standard gauge and  rail networks of the Spanish nationalized infrastructure company ADIF. Both were formed from the break-up of the former national carrier RENFE (Spanish: Red Nacional de los Ferrocarriles Españoles, "Spanish National Railway Network") and subsequently of FEVE ("Narrow-Gauge Spanish Railways").
 Ouigo España is a subsidiary of the French company SNCF that operates long range passenger trains in high-speed lines.
 Iryo is the brand of ILSA, a Spanish-Italian company formed by Air Nostrum and Trenitalia that also operates long range passenger trains in high-speed lines. Both Renfe, OUIGO and Iryo compete on several hight-speed lines owned by ADIF after the liberalization of long-range passenger rail transport.
 Euskotren (Spanish: Ferrocarriles Vascos, "Basque Railways") operates trains on part of the narrow gauge railway network in the Basque Country.
 FGC ("Catalan Government Railways") operates several unconnected lines in Catalonia.
 FGV ("Valencian Government Railways") operates several metre gauge lines in the Valencian Community.
 FS (Catalan: Ferrocarril de Sóller, "Sóller Railways") operates an electrified  narrow gauge railway on the Spanish island of Majorca between the towns of Palma and Sóller.
 SFM (Catalan: Serveis Ferroviaris de Mallorca, "Majorcan Railway Servicies") operates the  metre gauge railway network on the Spanish island of Majorca.
 Acciona Rail Services, a subsidiary of Acciona, operates a coal cargo line between Asturias and the province of León.
 COMSA Rail Transport, a subsidiary of COMSA, operates a cargo line from the Port of Gijón to Valladolid.
 Continental Rail is dedicated to bringing materials into the gorges of the high-speed lines in progress.

Lines

Conventional Iberian gauge lines 

 Alcázar de San Juan–Cádiz railway
 Algeciras-Bobadilla railway
 Barcelona–Cerbère railway
 Casetas–Bilbao railway
 Chinchilla–Cartagena railway
 Córdoba–Málaga railway
 León–A Coruña railway
 Linares Baeza–Almería railway
 Madrid–Barcelona railway
 Madrid−Aranda−Burgos (mostly non-operational)
 Madrid–Hendaye railway
 Madrid–Valencia railway
 Madrid−Valencia de Alcántara railway
 Valencia−Sant Vicenç de Calders railway
 Venta de Baños–Gijón railway
 Huelva–Seville railway

High-speed standard gauge lines

Operational

 Antequera–Granada high-speed rail line
 Atlantic Axis high-speed rail line
 Madrid–Barcelona high-speed rail line
 Perpignan–Barcelona high-speed rail line (Figueres-Barcelona section)
 Madrid–León high-speed rail line
 Madrid–Levante high-speed rail line (Madrid–Valencia, Madrid–Alicante)
 Madrid–Málaga high-speed rail line
 Madrid–Seville high-speed rail line
 Madrid–Galicia high-speed rail line

Under construction
 Basque Y
 Murcia–Almería high-speed rail line

Narrow gauge lines

In Spain there is an extensive 1,250 km (780 mi) system of metre gauge railways.

Metro/light rail systems

 Alicante  (Alicante Tram)
 Barcelona (Barcelona Metro/Tram)
 Bilbao (Bilbao Metro/Tram)
 Cádiz (Cádiz Bay tram-train)
 Granada (Granada Metro).
 Jaén (Jaén Tram) built in 2011 but without service for political reasons.
 Madrid (Madrid Metro)
 Málaga (Málaga Metro)
 Murcia (Murcia tram)
 Palma (Palma Metro)
 Parla (Parla Tram)
 Santa Cruz de Tenerife (Tenerife Tram)
San Sebastian (San Sebastián Metro) 
 Seville (Seville Metro/Tram)
 Valencia (Metrovalencia)
 Vélez-Málaga (Vélez-Málaga Tram) opened in 2006, closed 2012
 Vitoria-Gasteiz (Vitoria-Gasteiz tram)
 Zaragoza (Zaragoza Tram)

Rail links with adjacent countries 
 France – break-of-gauge / (new high-speed line links without any break-of-gauge)
 Portugal – same gauge

Andorra has no rail system (the closest station to Andorra is the French station of Andorre-L'Hospitalet station). The British overseas territory of Gibraltar has no rail system either. The Moroccan rail network is not connected neither to the Iberian Peninsula (although an undersea tunnel has been proposed) neither to the Spanish autonomous cities of Melilla and Ceuta (respectively closest to the Moroccan stations of Beni Ansar and Tangier-Med).

Subsidies
In 2004, the Spanish government adopted a new strategic plan for transportation through 2020 called the PEIT (Strategic Plan for Infrastructures and Transport). This detailed rail subsidies of around €9.3 billion annually on average from 2005-2020. In 2010, it rolled out a two-year plan to invest an extra €11 billion each year for two years, as a part of a financial stimulus in response to the global downturn. In 2015, the federal budget for the railways was €5.1 billion.

See also

 Transport in Spain
 Rail transport in Europe

References

http://www.gosanangelo.com/news/2012/feb/03/thomas-sowell-getting-nowhere-but-very-fast-in/?preventMobileRedirect=1
http://jewishworldreview.com/cols/sowell013112.php3